Smilax australis (lawyer vine, austral sarsaparilla, barbwire vine, or "wait-a-while") is a vine in the family  Smilacaceae, endemic to Australia. It has prickly climbing stems that are up to 8 metres long with coiled tendrils that are up to 20 cm long. The glossy leaves have 5 prominent longitudinal veins and are 5 to 15 cm long and 3 to 10 cm wide.

Distribution
The species occurs in rainforest, sclerophyll forest, woodland and heathland in the Northern Territory, Queensland, New South Wales, Victoria, Lord Howe Island, and the northeastern corner of Western Australia.

See also
 Wait-a-minute tree

References

Smilacaceae
Monocots of Australia
Flora of New South Wales
Flora of Queensland
Flora of Victoria (Australia)
Angiosperms of Western Australia
Plants described in 1810
Vines